The swimming competitions of the 1984 Summer Olympics were held at the McDonald's Olympic Swim Stadium, located on the University of Southern California (USC) campus. There were a total of 494 participants from 67 countries competing.

This was the first Olympic Games at which only two swimmers per country, per event, were permitted; previously, three swimmers were allowed and many countries would sweep the medal stand. In addition, the 200-metre individual medley for both men and women returned to the program from a twelve-year absence, following a proposal by the United States Olympic & Paralympic Committee (USOC).

Medal table

Medal summary

Men's events

* Swimmers who participated in the heats only and received medals.

Women's events

*Swimmers who participated in the heats only and received medals.

Participating nations
494 swimmers from 67 nations competed.

See also
 Swimming at the Friendship Games

References

External links
1984 Summer Olympics history: swimming from http://www.swimmingworldmagazine.com/; retrieved 2015-06-22.

 
1984 Summer Olympics events
1984
1984 in swimming